Odetta at Town Hall is a live album by American folk singer Odetta, recorded at Town Hall, New York, NY, on April 5, 1963 and first released later that year.

At Town Hall is also available along with At Carnegie Hall from the same era, on Vanguard's double-LP The Essential Odetta, but the CD version of that release omits eight songs from the Town Hall LP and two songs from the Carnegie Hall LP.

Track listing
"Let Me Ride" (Traditional spiritual) – 1:34
"The Fox" (Traditional) – 1:51
"Santy Anno" (Traditional) – 2:35
"Devilish Mary" (Traditional) – 1:56
 "Another Man Done Gone" (Vera Hall, Alan Lomax, John Lomax, Ruby Pickens Tartt) – 2:33
"Children's Trilogy" (Jimmy Driftwood) – 2:07
"He Had a Long Chain On" (Traditional) – 6:26
"He's Got the Whole World in His Hands" (Traditional spiritual) – 2:06
"Take This Hammer" (Traditional) – 3:57
"Ox Driver" (Traditional; arranged and adapted by Bob Corman and Harry Belafonte) – 3:07
"Hound Dog" (Traditional) – 4:44
"Carry It Back to Rosie" (Traditional) – 3:27
"What Month Was Jesus Born In?" (Traditional spiritual) – 2:22
"The Frozen Logger" (Ivar Haglund, James Stevens) – 2:52
"Timber" (Sam Gray, Josh White) – 3:26
"Freedom Trilogy: Oh Freedom/ Come and Go with Me/ I'm on My Way" (Traditional) – 7:29

Personnel
Odetta Holmes – vocals, guitar
Bill Lee – bass

References

Odetta live albums
1963 live albums
Vanguard Records live albums
albums recorded at the Town Hall